Nikolaos Rokas was a Greek soldier who participated in almost all Greek conflicts of the first half of the 20th century and ultimately rose to the rank of lieutenant general.

Career
Nikolaos Rokas was born in Mandra, near Elefsis, in 1869. He enlisted in the Hellenic Army as a volunteer on 9 January 1887, was named sergeant after studies in the NCO preparatory school, and fought in the Greco-Turkish War of 1897. After further studies in the non-commissioned officer academy, he was commissioned as a second lieutenant on 29 August 1902.

In 1905–1907, he went to Ottoman-ruled Macedonia as a leader of an armed band during the Macedonian Struggle. He assumed the nom de guerre of Kapetan Kolios (Καπετάν Κολιός), and operated in the area of Mount Olympus and Vodena and Naousa. After returning to Greece in 1907, he was sent to the autonomous Cretan State to organize its military forces. He participated in the Balkan Wars of 1912–1913 as a lieutenant and company commander. Promoted to captain, he led a battalion in Northern Epirus. He fought in the Macedonian front of World War I as commander of the 16th Infantry Regiment on the River Strymon sector. He then led the 16th and the 1st Infantry Regiments in the Greek participation in the Southern Russia intervention. 

During the subsequent Asia Minor Campaign he led the 31st Infantry Regiment in 1921, followed by the 33rd Infantry Regiment, and finally by the 5th Infantry Division at the time of the collapse of the Greek front in August 1922. After the Greek defeat, he was dismissed from the army, but was rehabilitated in June 1927, receiving a promotion to major general. He was promoted to lieutenant general and retired in 1929.

On the outbreak of the Greco-Italian War in 1940, he was recalled to active service and appointed head of the Alexandroupoli Military Command.

He died at Athens in 1947.

Awards
Nikolaos Rokas was awarded the Gold Cross of the Order of the Redeemer and made Commander of the Order of the Phoenix. He also received Greece's highest award for gallantry, the Gold Cross of Valour, several times, along with the Greek War Cross. Additionally. he was a recipient of several foreign awards: the British Distinguished Service Medal, the French Legion of Honour and Croix de Guerre, and the Serbian War Cross.

References 

1869 births
1947 deaths
Hellenic Army generals
Greek military personnel of the Balkan Wars
Greek military personnel of the Greco-Turkish War (1897)
Greek military personnel of the Greco-Turkish War (1919–1922)
Greek military personnel of World War I
People from West Attica
Greek military personnel of the Macedonian Struggle
Recipients of the Legion of Honour
Commanders of the Order of the Phoenix (Greece)
Recipients of the Distinguished Service Medal (United Kingdom)
Recipients of the Cross of Valour (Greece)
Recipients of the War Cross (Greece)
Greek military personnel of World War II